L'Isle-de-Noé is a commune in the Gers department in southwestern France.

Geography
The Petite Baïse forms part of the commune's southeastern border, flows northwest through the middle of the commune, then flows into the Baïse in the village.

The Baïse forms part of the commune's southern border, flows north through the middle of the commune, then forms part of its northern border.

Population

See also
Communes of the Gers department

References

Communes of Gers